The Health and Social Care Levy was a proposed tax in the United Kingdom to be levied by the Government of the United Kingdom for extra health spending, expected to be launched in 2023. Provision for the tax is given under the Health and Social Care Levy Bill and it is designed to deal with the backlog of patients waiting for treatment following the COVID-19 pandemic as well as to improve social care. The tax, which is initially to be raised from a 1.25% increase in National Insurance contributions, was expected to raise £12bn a year.

Details of the Health and Social Care Levy were announced in the House of Commons by Prime Minister Boris Johnson on 7 September 2021, with plans for its introduction in April 2023. Under the proposals, there was firstly a rise in National Insurance contributions before a separate tax on earned income would have been introduced from 2023, and be calculated in the same way as National Insurance, except that it would also have been paid by those who have reached State Pension Age. The new tax would appear on individual payslips. At the same time it was confirmed that a share of the tax would also go to the NHS in Scotland, NHS in Wales and Northern Ireland's Health and Social Care system, with an extra £1.1bn for Scotland, £700m for Wales, and £400m for Northern Ireland.

The proposals attracted criticism from some backbench MPs in Johnson's Conservative Party who accused him of reneging on a manifesto commitment made at the 2019 general election not to increase tax contributions. In response to this criticism, Johnson accepted the tax broke a manifesto pledge, but argued the "global pandemic was in no-one's manifesto". Senior figures in the care sector also expressed their concern the Health and Social Care Tax would not address problems with the system, with Nadra Ahmed, the executive chairman of the National Care Association describing it as "misleading because the body of the plan [is] about NHS recovery". Political parties in Northern Ireland criticised the plans as "inequitable" and "regressive". On 12 September, HM Revenue and Customs predicted the tax would have a "significant" impact on wages, inflation, and company profits, and could also lead to the breakdown of families. In response, Health Secretary Sajid Javid said it was the fairest way to fund investment.

On 8 September MPs voted in favour of the tax rise plan by 319 votes to 248, a majority of 71. On 14 September the Health and Social Care Levy Bill, the legislation enacting the tax, passed its third reading in the House of Commons with MPs voting 307–251 in favour, a majority of 56.

The new levy along with the increase in national insurance contributions which was implemented the previous year was reversed by new chancellor of the exchequer Kwasi Kwarteng under the Truss ministry. The increased NICs which had already been applied would revert to 12% from 6 November 2022.

References

External links 
 UK Government Introduction

Proposed laws of the United Kingdom
Taxation in the United Kingdom
2021 in British politics
National Health Service
Impact of the COVID-19 pandemic in the United Kingdom on politics
Boris Johnson